The 2006 European Youth Baseball Championship was an international baseball competition held in Gijon, Spain from July 4 to July 9, 2006. It featured teams from Austria, Czech Republic, France, Netherlands, Poland, Russia, Slovakia and Spain.

In the end the team from the Netherlands won the tournament.

Group stage

Pool A

Standings

Game results

Pool B

Standings

Game results

Final round

Pool C

Standings

Game results

Semi-finals

3rd place

Final

Final standings

External links
Game Results

References

European Youth Baseball Championship
European Youth Baseball Championship
2006
2006 in Spanish sport